Angelou is a crater on Mercury. It has a diameter of 18 kilometers. Its name was adopted by the International Astronomical Union (IAU) on September 11, 2019. Angelou is named for the American poet and author Maya Angelou.

Angelou lies on the west side of the much larger Goethe crater.

References

Impact craters on Mercury
Maya Angelou